Mark Bayes (born 15 March 1967) is a former Australian rules footballer who played for the Sydney Swans in the Victorian/Australian Football League. 

Originally from Noble Park, Bayes played 246 games and kicked 174 goals for the Swans. He was named on the interchange bench in the Sydney Swan's official 'Team of the Century,' and in 1989 was voted Sydney's best and fairest player.

Bayes usually played in defence but was capable of going forward and had an accurate left foot kick. He played in the 1996 AFL Grand Final.

References

External links

Living people
Australian rules footballers from Victoria (Australia)
Sydney Swans players
Bob Skilton Medal winners
1967 births
Victorian State of Origin players